Kincardine may refer to:

Places

Scotland
Kincardine, Fife, a town on the River Forth, Scotland
Kincardine Bridge, a bridge which spans the Firth of Forth
Kincardineshire, a historic county
Kincardine, Aberdeenshire, now abandoned 
Kincardine and Deeside, a former local government district 
Kincardine and Mearns, a current local government district 
Kincardine, Sutherland
Kincardine O'Neil, Deeside
Abernethy and Kincardine, Highland
Kincardine-in-Menteith, Stirling

Canada
Kincardine, Ontario
Kincardine, Ontario (community)

Other uses
 Earl of Kincardine, a title in the Peerage of Scotland

See also

 Kincardine Castle (disambiguation), several castles in Scotland